Mr. Smith is an American sitcom that aired on NBC from September 23 through December 16, 1983. The title character was a talking orangutan. Mr. Smith was canceled after thirteen episodes had been aired.

The orangutan who played Mr. Smith had previously been featured in the 1978 film Every Which Way But Loose and its 1980 sequel Any Which Way You Can.

Synopsis
Originally a part of a traveling act called the Atwood Orangutans, Cha Cha and Bobo are separated from their trainer Tommy Atwood (Tim Dunigan) after he is knocked unconscious in a car accident while the act is traveling from Arizona to California. Frightened by the commotion caused by the accident, Cha Cha and Bobo both run away. Cha Cha is eventually found and sent to a government research center in Washington, D.C.. Weeks later, Cha Cha escapes from the center and ends up in a research lab where he finds an experimental mixture to increase human intelligence being developed. After drinking the mixture, Cha Cha is able to talk (his voice was provided by series executive producer Ed. Weinberger) and is later determined to have an I.Q of 256. He is then renamed Mr. Smith and, due to his high intelligence, becomes a political adviser. Mr. Smith's old trainer Tommy later becomes his assistant while Mr. Smith attempts to solve various political problems and his surrounding staff, which includes his secretary Raymond Holyoke (Leonard Frey), attempt to keep his identity hidden from the general public.

Mr. Smith's premiere episode brought in a weak 12.1/22 rating/share and ranked 47th out of 57 shows that week  and was panned by critics. Viewership decreased as the season progressed and the series was canceled (along with seven other NBC series) in December 1983.

Cast
 Leonard Frey as Raymond Holyoke
 Tim Dunigan as Tommy Atwood
 Terri Garber as Dr. July Tyson
 Laura Jacoby as Ellie Atwood
 Stuart Margolin as Dr. Klein

US television ratings

Episode list

Awards and nominations

References

External links
 

1983 American television series debuts
1983 American television series endings
1980s American sitcoms
Fantasy comedy television series
NBC original programming
Television shows about apes
Television series by CBS Studios
English-language television shows
Television shows set in California